The Newark Reservoir  is a reservoir in Newark, Delaware, located just north of downtown. Completed in 2006, it holds  of water pumped from White Clay Creek, which can supply the city for up to 100 days. At the north end there is also access to the adjacent William M. Redd, Jr. Park.

The reservoir was constructed between 2002 and 2005 after a major drought in 1999 made the need for a reserve water supply clear. The city chose a site on the Koelig farm property off Paper Mill Road, and ground was broken there on May 14, 2002. The completed reservoir was ready to be filled by November 2005, and the new facility was formally dedicated on May 24, 2006. The project cost $20 million in total. It was the first new reservoir to be constructed in Delaware since the Hoopes Reservoir in Wilmington, which was completed in 1932.

Aquatic activities are prohibited except during special events, like an annual triathlon that gives competitors the chance to swim in the reservoir. The swimming portion of the 2017 triathlon was canceled due to a cyanobacterial bloom.

References

Bodies of water in New Castle County, Delaware
Reservoirs in Delaware
Protected areas of New Castle County, Delaware